Note: The death toll quoted here is just the sum of the listings. There may be many omissions from the list. The human rights organisation B'Tselem has complied statistics of about 600 deaths during 2003 in the occupied territories alone.

Note: This compilation includes only those attacks that resulted in Israeli casualties. This list does not include all the deaths of Palestinians. The numerous other attacks which failed to murder, maim, or wound are not included.

January (death toll) 
1 January: Tareq Ziad Duas 15-year-old, killed on 1 January 2003. Sami Zidan 22-year-old, killed on 1 January 2003, Muhammad 'Atiyyah Duas 15-year-old killed on 1 January 2003, Jihad Jum'ah 'Abd 5 year-old, killed on 1 January 2003
2 January: The body of a 72-year-old Israeli was found in the northern Jordan Valley in his burned out car. The Fatah Al-Aqsa Martyrs' Brigades claimed responsibility for the murder. Tammer Khader 21-year-old, killed on 2 January 2003
5 January: 23 people, including eight foreigners, were murdered in two nearly simultaneous suicide bombings in central Tel Aviv. More than 100 others were reported seriously injured.  Islamic Jihad and Yasser Arafat's Al Aqsa Martyrs Brigades claimed responsibility. Another arm of Yassar Arafat's movement denied responsibility.
6 January: Israeli forces raided the Maghazi refugee camp in Gaza and killed three Palestinians and wounded a dozen more. Baker Muhammad Hadura 24-year-old, killed; Nassim Hassan Abu Maliah 25-year-old, killed; Iyad Muhammad Abu Za'id 26-year-old, killed
8 January: Ahmad 'Ajaj 8 January 2003, Aiman Muhammad Haneideq 30-year-old killed
10 January: Tareq Mahmoud 'Abd al-Quader Jadu 20-year-old, killed
11 January: Basman Shnir 20-year-old killed; 'Abd a-Latif Wadi 30-year-old, killed
12 January: A 48-year-old man was killed and four people wounded when terrorists infiltrated Moshav Gadish and opened fire. The Palestinian Islamic Jihad claimed responsibility for the attack.
12 January: Three Palestinians were killed; Muhammad Quar'a 14-year-old resident of Khan Yunis, killed; 'Ali Thaher Nassar 45-year-old killed; Hamadeh 'Abd a-Rahman a-Najar 13-year-old killed on 12 January 2003 and 12 wounded as 50 Israeli army vehicles accompanied with bulldozers and helicopters entered the town of Khan Yunis in the southern Gaza Strip during the night 11–12 January. Seven civilian facilities were blown up.
13 January: Jamal Mahmoud Abu al-Qumbuz 20-year-old killed
17 January: A 34-year-old Israeli was killed  when terrorists entered his home near Kiryat Arba, and opened fire. His 5-year-old daughter and two others were wounded. Hamas claimed responsibility for the attack.
26 January: During the night 25–26 January Israeli forces invaded the al-Zaytoun neighbourhood of Gaza City. Twelve Palestinians were killed, three were hit with shrapnel from an artillery shell and nine were shot dead. 17 workshops were blown up and 15 more were severely damaged.
31 January: 13 Palestinians and over 50 wounded as the IDF made its deepest incursion in Gaza City in years. Scores of buildings was raided and 13 factories blown up, many of them used to manufacture weapons.

February 
14 February: An Israeli Merkava III heavy tank was destroyed by a mine near Dugit and Beit Lahiya, killing 4 soldiers. Hamas claimed responsibility.

March (death toll: 21) 
5 March: Haifa bus 37 massacre – 17 killed, and about 53 injured in a suicide bombing on a bus in Haifa. Many of the fatalities were children returning home from school. The attack was conducted by Hamas.
7 March: A couple from Kiryat Arba, were killed and five wounded by armed terrorists disguised as Jewish worshippers who infiltrated Kiryat Arba, entered their home and murdered them while they were celebrating the Sabbath. Hamas claimed responsibility for the attack.
16 March: Rachel Corrie, an American member of the International Solidarity Movement in Rafah, was killed when she tried to obstruct an Israel Defense Forces bulldozer operating in a Palestinian residential area of Rafah.
19 March: A 51-year-old Israeli was shot dead while driving in his car between Mevo Dotan and Shaked in the West Bank). The Fatah al-Aqsa Martyrs Brigades claimed responsibility.

April (death toll: 14) 
8 April: Two Israeli combat helicopters, accompanied by an F-16 fighter jet, attacked a densely populated area of Gaza City. One helicopter launched two missiles against a car carrying Hamas leader Sa'id Arbid. Arbid and two other Hamas members were killed when the car exploded. Soon after a crowd of Palestinians gathered around the car, the helicopter fired a third missile and killed five more. In total seven Palestinians were killed and 53 more were wounded.
11 April: Tom Hurndall, a British member of the International Solidarity Movement, was shot in the head by an Israel Defense Forces sniper. He died after almost a year in coma 13 January 2004.
15 April: An Israeli and a Palestinian were killed and four Israelis were wounded when a Palestinian militant opened fire at the Karni industrial zone crossing in the Gaza Strip. Hamas claimed responsibility for the attack.
24 April: A 23-year-old Israeli security guard was killed and 13 were wounded in a suicide bombing outside the train station in Kfar Saba. Groups related to the Fatah al-Aqsa Martyrs Brigades and the PFLP claimed joint responsibility for the attack.
30 April: Three Israelis were killed, and about 60 injured when a British Muslim suicide bomber blows himself up outside Mike's Place bar on the Tel Aviv coast. A second would-be suicide bomber, also a British citizen, failed to explode and attempted to escape through the sea. His body was washed away to the shore a few days later. On 8 March 2004, Hamas claimed responsibility for the attack, and released a videotape showing an interview with the two terrorists.

May (death toll: 15) 
2 May: A British cameraman was shot dead by Israeli soldiers in Rafah.
5 May: An Israeli was killed and two others (including the victim's 6-year-old daughter) were seriously wounded when terrorists fired shots at their vehicle near Shvut Rachel, in the northern West Bank. The Fatah al-Aqsa Martyrs' Brigades claimed responsibility for the attack.
11 May: A 53-year-old Israeli man was shot in the head and killed by Palestinians in a roadside ambush north of [Jerusalem]. Both Fatah and the Popular Front for the Liberation of Palestine claimed responsibility for the attack.
17 May: An Israeli couple were killed by a suicide bomber in Hebron. Hamas claimed responsibility for the attack.
18 May: Palestinian suicide bomber kills seven, wounds 20 on bus in Jerusalem's French Hill district. [Hamas] claimed responsibility for the attack.
19 May: A suicide bomber blows herself up at the entrance to a mall in the northern Israeli town of Afula. Three people were killed and about 60 wounded. The Islamic Jihad and the Fatah al-Aqsa Martyrs Brigades both claimed responsibility for the attack.

June (death toll: 26) 
5 June:  The bodies of two Israelis were found near Hadassah Ein Kerem hospital in Jerusalem, brutally beaten and stabbed to death.
8 June: Haviv Dadon, 16, of Shlomi was killed and four other Israelis wounded in a Hizbullah rocket attack.
11 June: 17 people were killed and over 100 wounded when a suicide bomber detonated himself on board a #14A bus in downtown Jerusalem. Hamas claimed responsibility.
12 June: A 51-year-old Israeli was found shot to death in his car in the West Bank. The Fatah al-Aqsa Martyrs Brigades claimed responsibility for the attack.
17 June: An Israeli 7-year-old girl was killed and three of her family members (including her younger sister) wounded when Palestinians, armed with assault rifles, attacked the car they were travelling in, on road no. 6, some few hundreds meters far from Qalqiliya. The Al-Aqsa Martyrs' Brigades claimed responsibility.
19 June: An Israeli shopkeeper was killed in Sdei-Trumot (a village in northern Israel), when a Palestinian suicide bomber blew himself up inside the shop. The Islamic Jihad claimed responsibility for the attack.
20 June: A 47-year-old Israeli was killed when his car was fired upon in an ambush by Palestinians north of Ramallah. His parents, US citizens, were seriously wounded and his wife lightly injured. Hamas claimed responsibility for the attack.
26 June: An Israeli phone company employee was killed in a shooting attack by a Palestinian teenager in the Israeli Arab town of Baka al-Garbiyeh. The Fatah al-Aqsa Martyrs Brigades claimed responsibility for the attack.
30 June: A 46-year-old construction worker from Bulgaria was killed in a shooting attack on a road west of Jenin, while driving a truck. The Fatah Al-Aqsa Martyrs Brigades claimed responsibility for the attack, in opposition to the declared ceasefire.

July (death toll: 2) 
7 July: A 65-year-old Israeli woman was killed in her home in Moshav Kfar Yavetz and three of her grandchildren lightly wounded in a terrorist suicide bombing. The Islamic Jihad claimed responsibility for the attack.
15 July A 24-year-old Israeli was stabbed to death while protecting his girlfriend against a Palestinian armed with a long-bladed knife on Tel Aviv's beach-front promenade. The terrorist, who was shot and apprehended, was a member of the Fatah Al-Aqsa Martyrs Brigades, which claimed responsibility for the attack.

August (death toll: 27) 
12 August: A 43-year-old Israeli was murdered by a teenage Palestinian suicide bomber who detonated himself in a Rosh Ha'ayin supermarket.
12 August: Two Israelis were killed by a teenage Palestinian suicide bomber who detonated himself at a bus stop outside Ariel.
19 August: Jerusalem bus 2 massacre – 23 killed, 136 wounded by an explosion, caused by a Palestinian suicide bomber, on board a bus in Jerusalem. Among the victims were several children. The Palestinian Islamic Jihad in Hebron, and Hamas claimed responsibility for the attack.
29 August: A 25-year-old Israeli was killed in a shooting attack while driving north-east of Ramallah. His wife who was seven months pregnant, sustained moderate injuries, and gave birth to a baby girl by Caesarean section. The Fatah al-Aqsa Brigades claimed responsibility for the attack.

September (death toll: 18) 
9 September: Nine non-combat soldiers were killed and over 30 wound when a suicide bomber exploded in a bus stop near Asaf-Ha-Rofe hospital and the military base of Tzrifin. Hamas claimed responsibility.
9 September: Seven people were killed and over 50 wounded when a suicide bomber exploded at the Café Hillel in Jerusalem. Hamas claimed responsibility.
26 September: A 7-month-old baby girl and a 29-year-old man were killed, and both of the baby's parents were wounded, when a Palestinian gunman entered their home in Negohot (in the West Bank) and opened fire during the family's celebration of the Jewish New Year.

October (death toll: 41) 
4 October: Maxim restaurant suicide bombing – 21 people were killed and 64 wounded when the female suicide bomber Hanadi Jaradat explodes in the Jewish-Arab Maxim restaurant in Haifa. Four of the victims were children, including a 2-month-old. The Islamic Jihad group claimed responsibility for the suicide-massacre. The terrorist attack came just a day before Yom Kippur.
19 October: Three Israeli soldiers were killed and two more were injured after a roadside ambush near Ein-Yabrud village, south of Ofra on the West Bank.
20 October: The Israeli air force launched five attacks in Gaza, killing 14 people and wounding 100.
24 October: Two female soldiers and one male soldier were killed after two militants infiltrated into the military court inside Netzarim settlement on the Gaza Strip. Three more soldier were wounded.

November (death toll: 8) 
18 November: Two soldiers were killed by a Palestinian gunman in a checkpoint near Bethlehem.
19 November: Four people were injured and one woman was killed, when an Arab terrorist, Ahmed Jahid, opened fire on a group of tourist in Rabin border crossing between the Arava (Israel) and Aqaba (Jordan). The terrorist was killed by Israeli security guards and it is believed he was sent by Al-Qaeda.
22 November: Two Israeli civilian security guards were killed in a construction site near Nahal Kidron at the outskirts of Jerusalem. The Al-Aqsa Martyrs' Brigades claimed responsibility.
26 November: Three Palestinian civilians riding in a car on the Gaza Strip were killed by Israeli soldiers.

December (death toll: 4) 
3 December: The Israeli security forces captured two terrorists on their way to commit a massacre in Yokneam Illit school. The two were members of the Palestinian security apparatus and were armed with a 10 kg explosive belt. 
25 December: 4 Israelis were killed as a 17-year-old suicide bomber blew himself up in a bus station on a main road between Tel Aviv and Petah Tikva. The PFLP claimed responsibility.

See also

2003 in Israel
2003 in the Palestinian territories
List of Palestinian rocket attacks on Israel in 2002–2006
Second Intifada
Timeline of the Israeli–Palestinian conflict

References 

2003 in Israel
2003 in the Palestinian territories
Israeli-Palestinian conflict
2003
2003
2003
Terrorist incidents in Israel in 2003
2003